9321 Alexkonopliv, provisional designation , is a carbonaceous background asteroid from the outer region of the asteroid belt, approximately 11 kilometers in diameter.

The asteroid was discovered on 5 January 1989, by Japanese astronomer Takuo Kojima at the YGCO Chiyoda Station, Japan. It was named for JPL-scientist Alex Konopliv.

Orbit and classification 

Alexkonopliv is a non-family asteroid from the main belt's background population. It orbits the Sun in the outer asteroid belt at a distance of 2.3–3.9 AU once every 5 years and 6 months (2,004 days). Its orbit has an eccentricity of 0.26 and an inclination of 4° with respect to the ecliptic.

Naming 

This minor planet was named after JPL-scientist Alex Konopliv (born 1960), an internationally recognized authority on the measurement of the gravitational field of Solar System bodies tracked by satellites in Earth's orbit. Various Mars missions used his gravity field determinations for the Red Planet. The official naming citation was published by the Minor Planet Center on 5 October 1998.

Physical characteristics

Rotation period 

In December 2010, a rotational lightcurve of Alexkonopliv was obtained from photometric observation at the Palomar Transient Factory in California. Lightcurve analysis gave a rotation period of  hours with a brightness variation of 0.19 magnitude.

Diameter and albedo 

According to the survey carried out by NASA's space-based Wide-field Infrared Survey Explorer with its subsequent NEOWISE mission, Alexkonopliv measures 10.3 kilometers in diameter and its surface has an albedo of 0.116, while the Collaborative Asteroid Lightcurve Link assumes a standard albedo for carbonaceous asteroids of 0.057 and calculates a diameter of 11.5 kilometers with an absolute magnitude of 13.43.

References

External links 
 Asteroid Lightcurve Database (LCDB), query form (info )
 Dictionary of Minor Planet Names, Google books
 Asteroids and comets rotation curves, CdR – Observatoire de Genève, Raoul Behrend
 Discovery Circumstances: Numbered Minor Planets (5001)-(10000) – Minor Planet Center
 
 

009321
Discoveries by Takuo Kojima
Named minor planets
19890105